Archikatedra Chrystusa Króla w Katowicach is a classicist archcathedral in Katowice-Śródmieście, Katowice, Poland. Constructed between 1927 and 1955, the Archcathedral of Christ the King is the largest archcathedral in Poland.

Roman Catholic cathedrals in Poland
Churches in Katowice
Church buildings with domes